Philippe Jeantot (born 8 May 1952 in Antananarivo, Madagascar) is a French former deep sea diver, who achieved recognition as a sailor for long-distance, single-handed racing and record-setting. He founded the Vendée Globe, a single-handed, round-the-world, non-stop yacht race.

Biography 

He became interested in sailing after reading Bernard Moitessier's book The Long Way; having learned to sail, he built himself a 13.5-metre (44 ft) steel ketch, planning to sail single-handed around the world. After cruising for two years, he entered the first edition of the BOC Challenge (now known as the Velux 5 Oceans Race) in 1982; he won the race, and broke the previous record for a single-handed circumnavigation with a time of 159 days, 2 hours.

In 1984, Jeantot entered the OSTAR, sailing in a new catamaran, Credit Agricole II. He was forced to retire after a capsize, but saved the boat and entered the 1984 Quebec—St. Malo race, in which he set a new 24-hour speed record. In 1985, he had success in the Grand Prix de Brest, La Baule and Round Europe races.  In 1986 he again entered the BOC Challenge, sailing Credit Agricole III, and was again victorious.

In 1989, Jeantot founded a new, single-handed, non-stop, round-the-world race, the Vendée Globe.  He entered the race in Crédit Agricole IV, and finished in fourth place.

In 1990, Jeantot once again entered the BOC Challenge, sailing Crédit Agricole IV, and finishing in third place, thus completing his fourth solo circumnavigation of the world. After the race, he announced that he was retiring from sailing to manage his boat-building business.

In November 1990, Jeantot was given a suspended two-year sentence and fined €15,000 (£9,900) for tax evasion.  Jeantot appealed but the verdict was upheld.

In 2006 Jeantot was charged with financial irregularities which alleged avoidance of corporation tax by his SailCom company, forgery and the misuse of the 'company assets'. Forensic accountancy allegedly found that in excess of €1 million (£660,000) passed through an Irish account rather than SailCom's bank in France. SailCom was set up by Jeantot to run long distance competitive sailing races.

Bibliography

References 

1952 births
Living people
People from Antananarivo
French male sailors (sport)
Vendée Globe finishers